The 2021–22 Santosh Trophy group stage is played from 16 April to 25 April. A total of 10 teams contest in the group stage to decide the four places in the semi-finals of the 2021–22 Santosh Trophy.

Draw
The official draw for the 75th edition of Santosh Trophy was held on 6 January 2022  at 15:00 IST in New Delhi with former India defender Gouramangi Singh assisting in the process. Ten teams who came through the qualifiers were drawn into two groups of five each for the main event beginning from 16 April. On 31 March the host of the event was announced to be Malappuram, Kerala, with the final being held at Manjeri Payyanad Stadium.

Group A

Points table

Matches

Group B

Points table

Matches

References

2021–22 Santosh Trophy